Yapahuwa (Sinhalese language : යාපහුව) was one of the ephemeral capitals of medieval Sri Lanka. The citadel of Yapahuwa lying midway between Kurunagala and Anuradhapura was built around a huge granite rock rising abruptly almost a hundred meters above the surrounding lowlands.

In 1272, King Bhuvenakabahu transferred the capital from Polonnaruwa to Yapahuwa in the face of Dravidian invasions from South India, bringing the Sacred Tooth Relic with him. Following the death of King Bhuvenakabahu in 1284, the Pandyans of South India invaded Sri Lanka once again, and succeeded in capturing Sacred Tooth Relic. Following its capture, Yapahuwa was largely abandoned and inhabited by Buddhist monks and religious ascetics.

Location and Name
The rock fortress complex of Yapahuwa is situated in the North Western Province, Sri Lanka. It is approximately between southeast of Mahawa midway Kurunegala and Anuradhapura. The original name of this Buddhist Heritage is Yapawwa, but now this is called as Yapahuwa which is a kind of distortion of its genuine etymological sense.

History
Yapahuwa served as the capital of Sri Lanka in the latter part of the 13th century (1273–1284). Built on a huge, 90 meter high rock boulder in the style of the Sigiriya rock fortress, Yapahuwa was a palace and military stronghold against foreign invaders.

The palace and fortress were built by King Buvanekabahu I (1272–1284) in the year 1273. Many traces of ancient battle defences can still be seen, while an ornamental stairway, is its biggest showpiece. This staircase is a long one with around 100 steps. On top of the rock are the remains of a stupa, a Bodhi tree enclosure, and a rock shelter/cave used by Buddhist monks, indicating that earlier this site was used as a Buddhist monastery, like many boulders and hills in the area. There are several caves at the base of the rock. In one of them there is a shrine with Buddha images. One cave has a Brahmi script inscription.
At the southern base of the rock there is a fortification with two moats and ramparts. In this enclosure there are the remains of a number of buildings including a Buddhist shrine. There is also a Buddhist temple called Yapahuwa Rajamaha Vihara built during the Kandyan period.

The Tooth Relic was brought from Dambadeniya and kept in the Tooth Temple built for the purpose at the top of the third staircase. The relics were carried away from the temple here to South India by the Pandyas, and then recovered in 1288 by Parakkramabahu III (1287–1293), who temporarily placed them in safety at Polonnaruwa.

Image gallery

See also
 Sigiriya
 Mahawa, Sri Lanka

External links

Yapahuwa Sri Lanka
Yapahuwa - The Chinese connection
Yapahuwa

Geography of Sri Lanka
Archaeological sites in Sri Lanka
Tourist attractions in North Western Province, Sri Lanka